Isopogon adenanthoides, commonly known as the spider coneflower, is a plant in the family Proteaceae and is endemic to the southwest of Western Australia. It is an erect shrub with sharply-pointed, trifid leaves and spherical heads of pink flowers.

Description

Taxonomy
Isopogon adenanthoides was first formally described in 1855 by Carl Meissner in Hooker's Journal of Botany and Kew Garden Miscellany from specimens collected by James Drummond.

Distribution and habitat
Spider coneflower grows in shrubland and heath from near Eneabba and Badgingarra to near Moora in the south-west of Western Australia.

Conservation status
This isopogon is classified as "not threatened" by the Western Australian Government Department of Parks and Wildlife.

References

adenanthoides
Eudicots of Western Australia
Taxa named by Carl Meissner
Plants described in 1855